Patrick Johnson (born February 19, 1993) is an American actor, known for playing "Ray 'Ray J' Santino Jr." in Necessary Roughness.

Born in Orlando, Florida, Johnson is the fifth of six children. He lives in Nashville, Tennessee. He and three of his siblings were signed to their first agent in Nashville. Within three weeks, he was out on his first audition and booked the job.

Filmography

Film

Television

Accolades

References

External links

1993 births
Living people
American male child actors
American male film actors
American male television actors
Male actors from Orlando, Florida
Male actors from Nashville, Tennessee
21st-century American male actors